MV Jessica was an oil tanker that was involved in an oil spill in the Galápagos Islands, a chain of islands  west of continental Ecuador, of which they are a part. The ship was registered in Ecuador and owned by Acotramar. On the evening of 16 January 2001, Jessica ran aground at Wreck Bay, at the entrance to the port of Puerto Baquerizo Moreno, the capital of the Galápagos Province, located on the southwestern coast of San Cristóbal Island. The ship was carrying 600 tons (160,000 gallons) of diesel oil and 300 tons (80,000 gallons) of intermediate fuel oil. The diesel was destined for the fuel dispatch station on Baltra Island, while the fuel oil was destined for the tourist vessel Galapagos Explorer.

On 20 January, the fuel oil began to spill from Jessica. Recovery attempts began immediately, with the Ecuadorian Navy, the GNP, and local fishermen and volunteers containing and recovering the oil from the ocean surface. Oiled animals were attended to. On San Cristóbal, seven Galápagos sea lions and 17 birds (brown pelicans and blue-footed boobies) were affected by the fuel oil spill. On Santa Fe Island, a number of sea lions were affected and the marine iguana population was greatly reduced.

Due to lack of equipment and conditions at sea, the containment measures failed, and slicks drifted with the wind. A small beach on the southern side of Santa Cruz Island, as well as Tortuga Bay, were affected. The United States Coast Guard assisted in recovering the fuel oil remaining aboard the ship.

References

NOAA Provides Oil Expertise in Galapagos Islands Spill
Accident of the Oil Tanker "JESSICA" off the Galapagos Islands (Ecuador) – Final Report to European Commission DG Environment ENV.C.3. – Civil Protection

Shipwrecks in the Pacific Ocean
Maritime incidents in 2001
Oil tankers